Shield of Thorns is the second solo studio album by Seattle musician Shawn Smith.  Two songs ("Leaving California" and "Wrapped in My Memory") were featured on the "Long Term Parking" episode of The Sopranos fifth season (2004) on HBO.

For detailed info on each version of this release, see Shawn Smith's Official Website

Track listing
"Leaving California"
"Shield of Thorns"
"Golden Age"
"Wrapped In My Memory"
"Full Moon Over Dallas"
"If Roses Take My Place"
"The Dark"
"Sing That Song For Beauty"

2003 albums
Shawn Smith albums